Toby Longworth is a British actor who has appeared on film, radio and television. He is originally from Somerset, where he attended King Edward's School, Bath. He has worked most often as a voice actor, however, notably in several science-fiction projects, audiobooks and video games.

Biography 
Between 1984 and 1989 Longworth was part of a double-act, The Rubber Bishops with Bill Bailey, a former school friend from Bath. Toby left in 1989 to join the RSC. He was later a regular performer on the radio comedy Week Ending.

Television 

Longworth has appeared in many TV series including The Legacy of Reginald Perrin, Nathan Barley, Nighty Night, The IT Crowd and Extras. Most recently he has appeared in The Stand Up Sketch Show (2019) and Breeders (2020). In 2022 he appeared in the first episode of Series 4 of Ghosts.

Longworth provided the voices of Lott Dod and Gragra in Star Wars: Episode I – The Phantom Menace. He can also be heard in The Hitchhiker's Guide to the Galaxy Tertiary to Quintessential Phases and  Hexagonal Phase, as Wowbagger and Prostetnic Vogon Jeltz.

He also appeared in some TV adverts of the 1990s for McDonalds ('Where Do Babies Come From'), Ikea ('Stop Being So English') and Ambrosia.

Audiobooks and dramas 

Longworth is a voice actor and has recorded over 200 audiobooks and audiodramas, for authors such as Iain Banks, Jeff Noon and Peter F. Hamilton, and books such as Rendezvous with Rama.

For Big Finish Productions including their Doctor Who spin-off range and taking the lead role as Judge Dredd in their line of audio plays based upon the 2000 AD series, as well as the supporting role of Wulf Sternhammer in the Strontium Dog series.
In Judge Dredd: Solo he provided the voices for all 34 roles, occasionally with the aid of vocal effects and multi-track recording.

He has given voice to over 120 of Games Workshop's Black Library audiobooks/audiodrama: Heart of Rage, Thunder from Fenris as well as the Horus Heresy dramas, Raven's Flight, Garro: Oath of Moment and Garro: Legion of One. He has also read for the audiobook versions of the Eisenhorn and Ravenor-trilogies.

He has narrated three documentaries for the BBC Worldwide Doctor Who DVD range, namely Paris in the Springtime on the 2005 DVD release of City of Death, A Matter of Time on the 2007 DVD box set of The Key to Time and Cheques, Lies and Videotape on the 2010 DVD release of Revenge of the Cybermen.

In April 2021 Toby launched Longworth and Longworth Audiobooks.

Video Games 

In 2003 Longworth was the voice of Judge Dredd in the video game Judge Dredd: Dredd vs Death. He has also voiced a number of the Broken Sword series of games, as well as Warhammer and Leisure Suit Larry. 

In 2009 Toby was chosen as the voice actor for Penultimo, a recurring character in the Tropico franchise, and has had this voice role since then.

In 2013 Toby voiced the protagonist and main character Oswald Mandus in the videogame Amnesia: A Machine for Pigs.

2014 he read and acted for the audio book version of the videogame novel Elite: Reclamation.

In 2019 he recorded Irony Curtain: From Matryoshka with Love.

References

External links

Toby Longworth on Theatricalia

English male radio actors
English male voice actors
People from Bath, Somerset
Place of birth missing (living people)
Year of birth missing (living people)
Living people
People educated at King Edward's School, Bath
Audiobook narrators